Anupama Kundoo (born in Pune in 1967) is an Indian architect.

Biography
Anupama Kundoo studied architecture at the Sir J. J. College of Architecture, University of Bombay and received her degree in 1989. She was awarded the Vastu Shilpa Foundation Fellowship in 1996 for her thesis on "Urban Eco-Community: Design and Analysis for Sustainability". She got her doctoral degree from the Technical University of Berlin in 2008.

Kundoo established herself as an architect in Auroville in 1990 where she designed and built many buildings with "energy and water efficient infrastructure" adaptations. She worked here from middle of 1990 till 2002.

Kundoo taught at the Technical University, Berlin, and Darmstadt in Hesse during 2005. She worked as Assistant Professor at Parsons The New School for Design, New York until 2011 then moving to Australia as a senior lecturer in the University of Queensland. In 2014, she shifted to Europe and began working at the European School of Architecture and Technology at the Universidad Camilo José Cela in Madrid.

Work
Her approach to building design is based on material research that minimizes environmental effects. Her basic design approach is to use "waste materials, unskilled labour and local communities".

This house is L-Shaped in the plan, has a courtyard in the middle; while it is modern in concept it adopts traditional "vernacular" use of materials such as compressed earth, concrete, and steel. The bathroom is set in an open-to-sky design, with smooth merging with the interior and external spaces and landscaped, giving it both a modern and a regional appearance. A full-sized replica of her Wall House was made by hand and exhibited at the Venice Biennale of Architecture. New York Times called it as "a gem among rubble".

Another of her theme is "Liberty" which presents a reading place as a free library, a creation built with three types of trees fixed in the centre of a square space. The trees' trunks and branches are made from steel and the leaves made of salvaged books, with the floor made of concrete. This was exhibited at the Placa de Salvador Segui in Barcelona during June–September 2014.

Publications
Books
Roger Anger: Research on Beauty/Recherche sur la beauté Architecture 1958–2008, jovis Verlag GmbH, Berlin, 2009
AVPNY Auroville and Pondicherry Architectural Travel Guide, Altrim Publishers, Barcelona, November 2019
Papers

 Das Tauziehen zwischen Umweltschutz und Entwicklung, Bauwelt, Bauverlag BV GmbH, Gütersloh, March 2011
 More than cladding, Design Today, Living Media India Ltd, New Delhi, June 2010
 Who decides what’s green, Design Today, Living Media India Ltd, New Delhi, March 2010
 Urban development, Options for urbanisation, Survey of the environment, The Hindu, Chennai, 2008
 Roger Anger: Chief Architect of Auroville, Architecture Time Space & People, Magazine of the Council of Architecture, India, Delhi, May 2008
 Auroville: An Architectural Laboratory, Made in India, AD Architectural Design, John Wiley and Sons Ltd., London, November – December 2007
 Eco-friendly Approach, Architecture + Design, Vol. XXIII, No 2, Media Transasia, Delhi, February 2006
 Sustainability and Globalisation, Indian Architect & Builder, Jasubhai Publications, Mumbai, July 2005
 Devoted to Dance, Ray Meeker´s expression to Protima Bedi´s parting gift, a fired temple at Nrityagram, Inside Outside, Mumbai, October 2000
 Cues from the Past – Local details and traditional elements in a contemporary structure, Indian Architect & Builder, Jasubhai Publications, Mumbai, October 1997
 Comments on Building Blocks, Indian Architect & Builder, Jasubhai Publications, Mumbai, January 1992

Awards
2021: The RIBA Charles Jencks Award, awarded jointly by the Jencks Foundation and the Royal Institute of British Architects.

References

Bibliography
 
 
 
 
 
 An emancipated place : the proceedings of the conference and exhibition held in Mumbai, February 2000 : women in architecture, 2000 plus : a conference on the work of women architects : focus South Asia. Somaya, Brinda., Mehta, Urvashi., Hecar Foundation. Mumbai: Hecar Foundation. 2000. . OCLC 48041242.

Living people
1967 births
Indian women architects
20th-century Indian architects
University of Mumbai alumni
Technical University of Berlin alumni
Artists from Pune
20th-century Indian women artists
Women artists from Maharashtra